Cassandra Rae Steele (born December 2, 1989) is a Canadian actress and singer known for portraying Manny Santos on Degrassi: The Next Generation and Abby Vargas on The L.A. Complex. In 2014, she played Sarah in the MTV horror television movie The Dorm. She also voices Tammy Gueterman and Tricia Lange in Adult Swim's Rick and Morty.

Early and personal life
Steele is of British descent on her father's side and Filipina descent on her mother's side. She began crafting her own songs to go with her poetry when she was in the first grade, she then began taking singing lessons. She attended London School of Dance in Scarborough, Ontario, and trained in ballet and jazz dance. She was also a gymnast for an unspecified amount of time.

Steele married American actor Trent Garrett in 2018.

Career

2001-2010: Degrassi: The Next Generation and early work
In 2001, Steele first appeared in a Fib Finder commercial alongside Cristine Rotenberg. She later, that year, appeared on an episode of Relic Hunter as the ten-year-old version of Sydney Fox.

Since she was eleven years old, Steele appeared as a regular cast member on Degrassi: The Next Generation playing the character of Manny Santos. She played the role for nine years, before exiting the show in 2010. She has also appeared in three Degrassi TV films: Degrassi Spring Break Movie, Degrassi Goes Hollywood and Degrassi Takes Manhattan.

During the filming of Degrassi, Steele also starred in the Disney film Full Court Miracle as well as the MTV movie Super Sweet 16: The Movie and My Babysitter's a Vampire and had recurring roles in The Best Years and Instant Star.

Steele has also embarked on a music career. Her debut album, How Much for Happy, was released in 2005, followed by two Canadian tours. Steele's follow-up album, Destructo Doll, was released on July 21, 2009. She appeared on Channel One News to promote the album for the music segment.

2011-present: The L.A. Complex and other projects
In 2011, Steele was cast as Abby Vargas in the series The L.A. Complex, which premiered on CTV and Much Music on January 10, 2012, and aired regularly on Much Music. On the same day as the premiere, the series was officially picked up by The CW to begin airing in the United States in the spring. It was renewed for a second season, which aired simultaneously on both Much Music and The CW that summer. The L.A. Complex was officially cancelled on December 20, 2012.

On April 17, 2012, Steele released the extended-play "Shifty" to iTunes. On April 1, 2014, her single "Mad" was released to iTunes. The official lyric video premiered on her VEVO page one day prior.

She starred as Valerie Vont in the Lifetime film Sorority Surrogate, which was released on March 22, 2014. She would appear as Sarah in the film The Dorm later that year.

On August 12, 2014, Steele released the album "Patterns" to iTunes. The official video for "Games" was released the same year on September 1, and it premiered on her VEVO page. Steele released the single "Power" shortly afterwards. It was released to iTunes on October 21, 2014.

Steele started the band "psychocandy" with Glint member Jase Blankfort in August 2019. Their single "Hunger" is available to stream on SoundCloud. On January 1, 2020, the band posted a photo on a new account on Instagram with the caption "2020."

In 2019, it was reported that Steele would voice the titular character in the Disney film Raya and the Last Dragon. On August 27, 2020, however, Steele was replaced by Kelly Marie Tran.

Discography

Albums

EPs

Other songs
"Things That God Cannot Explain" (2005)
"Pavement" (2008) 
"Crash My Party" (2009) 
"Life Is a Show" (2009) 
"One Saturday Night Away" (2009) 
"Something Sexy" (2010) 
"I Trust You" (2010) 
"Grain" (2010) 
"Mad" (2014) 
"Power" (2014)

Filmography

References

External links

 
 AOL Canada Interview With Cassie Steele
 

1989 births
Living people
21st-century Canadian actresses
21st-century Canadian women singers
Actresses from Toronto
Canadian actresses of Filipino descent
Canadian child actresses
Canadian child singers
Canadian expatriate actresses in the United States
Canadian musicians of Filipino descent
Canadian people of British descent
Canadian television actresses
Canadian voice actresses
Canadian women pop singers
Musicians from Toronto